Bethlehem station could refer to:

 Bethlehem Union Station in Bethlehem, Pennsylvania
 Bethlehem station (Central Railroad of New Jersey) in Bethlehem, Pennsylvania